Ematheudes paleatella is a species of snout moth in the genus Ematheudes. It was described by Ragonot in 1888, and is known from South Africa.

References

Moths described in 1998
Anerastiini